The women's individual competition of the triathlon events at the 2011 Pan American Games was held on October 23 at the API Maritime Terminal in Puerto Vallarta. The defending Pan American Games champion is Julie Ertel of the United States.

The race was held over the "international distance" and consisted of  swimming, road bicycling, and  road running.

The winner Sarah Haskins of the United States qualifies to compete in the triathlon competitions at the 2012 Summer Olympics in London, Great Britain.

Schedule
All times are Central Standard Time (UTC-6).

Results

Race
29 competitors from 16 countries are scheduled to compete.

References

Triathlon at the 2011 Pan American Games